The Hatton Ministry was the ministry of the third Chief Minister of the Northern Territory, Stephen Hatton.  It was sworn in on 15 May 1986, following the ousting of former Chief Minister Ian Tuxworth by his Mines and Energy Minister, Hatton.

First ministry (15 May 1986 – 18 March 1987)

The new ministry saw two main changes apart from the leadership, with Barry Coulter replacing Nick Dondas as Deputy Chief Minister and new minister Terry McCarthy being appointed to the junior role of Minister for Primary Production and Minister for Conservation. It operated until 18 March 1987, when Coulter was replaced as Deputy Chief Minister by Ray Hanrahan.

Second ministry (19 March 1987 – 7 May 1987)

The second ministry was sworn in on 19 March 1987 after a reshuffle of the ministry by Hatton. The new ministry saw two main changes from its predecessor: Ray Hanrahan replaced Barry Coulter as Deputy Chief Minister, although Coulter stayed on as Treasurer, and former Deputy Chief Minister Nick Dondas was dropped from the ministry. It also saw new minister Terry McCarthy dropped, with his portfolios being taken on by Hanrahan, and the appointment of another new minister, Fred Finch, who became Minister for Transport and Works. The ministry saw one change during its lifetime, with Minister for Labour and Administrative Services Tom Harris resigning from the ministry on 30 April 1987. Hatton took on Harris' portfolio for the remainder of the term of the ministry. It operated until 7 May 1987, when McCarthy was reappointed to the ministry to take on Harris' former portfolio.

Third ministry (8 May 1987 – 20 December 1987)

The third ministry was sworn in on 8 May 1987 after Hatton reappointed former minister Terry McCarthy to the ministry to take on the portfolio of Tom Harris, who had resigned as Minister for Labour and Administrative Services in April. The portfolio of local government, previously held by Barry Coulter was abolished on 27 November 1987, during the term of this ministry. The ministry operated until 20 December 1987, when Hatton undertook a further reshuffle of his ministry.

Fourth ministry (21 December 1987 – 5 April 1988)

The fourth ministry was sworn in on 21 December 1987. The ministry operated until 5 April 1988, when Deputy Chief Minister Ray Hanrahan resigned from the ministry, shortly before resigning from politics altogether.

Fifth ministry (6 April 1988 – 13 July 1988)

The fifth ministry was sworn in on 6 April 1988 after the resignation of Ray Hanrahan as Deputy Chief Minister and his succession by Barry Coulter. The new ministry also saw the return to the ministry of former minister Tom Harris as Minister for Education and the promotion of new minister Eric Poole as Minister for Tourism. The ministry operated until 13 July of that year, when Stephen Hatton resigned as Chief Minister and was replaced by Marshall Perron.

Ray Hanrahan continued as Leader of Government Business until 16 May 1988, despite having resigned from his Cabinet positions on 5 April.

References

Northern Territory ministries